Jason Evers (born Herbert Everberg or as Herbert Everin; January 2, 1922 – March 13, 2005) was an American actor. He was the star of the 1963 ABC television drama Channing.

Early life
Evers was born either as Herbert Everberg or Herbert Everin in New York City; he attended DeWitt Clinton High School there. His parents' names are recorded as William Everin (1894–1972) and Hilda (Weiserbs) Everin (1902–1995).

After leaving high school early to join the United States Army, Evers was so inspired by stars such as John Wayne (with whom he would later appear in The Green Berets) that he decided to try acting.

Career
Roles on Broadway led to Hollywood, where his first recurring role was on the 1960 NBC Western television series Wrangler. On June 30, 1960, Evers appeared on NBC's The Ford Show, Starring Tennessee Ernie Ford. He was cast for an episode of the ABC western series The Rebel ("Miz Purdy", 1961), appearing as George Tess. Evers made three guest appearances on Perry Mason, including the role of murder victim Stuart Benton in "The Case of the Difficult Detour" (1961), and defendant Roy Galen in "The Case of the Latent Lover" (1964). In "The Case of the Posthumous Painter" (also 1961), he played the defendant's brother.

In the 1963–64 season, Evers starred as 41-year-old Professor Jason Howe in the 26-episode ABC drama series Channing, based on life on a college campus. His most enduring role derived from the 1959 B-movie classic The Brain That Wouldn't Die, which was not released until 1962.

From 1967 to 1969, he appeared sporadically as James Sonnett, the missing son sought by the Walter Brennan character, Will Sonnett, in ABC's The Guns of Will Sonnett.

Evers and Kathie Browne featured in the 1968 Star Trek: The Original Series episode "Wink of an Eye". That same year, he also appeared in the films The Green Berets, P.J. and A Man Called Gannon, and also appeared in sci-fi films such as The Illustrated Man (1969) and Escape from the Planet of the Apes (1971).

Evers continued to appear in films and television, in such series as The Rockford Files, having guest-starred with Bruce Lee in the Green Hornet episode "Eat, Drink and be Dead" (1966), but they were of an increasingly minor nature. Evers also appeared as a race-car driver and a romantic interest of Doris Martin in The Doris Day Show in 1970. His later films included A Piece of the Action (1977), Claws (1977), and Barracuda (1978), and his final film appearance was in 1990 in Basket Case 2.

Personal life
On December 24, 1953, Evers married actress Shirley Ballard; they divorced in September 1966. In 1974, he married Diana James, and they divorced in May 1975.

Death
Evers died of heart failure in Los Angeles on March 13, 2005, aged 83.

Filmography

Film

Television

Notes

References

External links

 
  (as Herbert Evers)

 Jason Evers at Find A Grave

1922 births
2005 deaths
20th-century American male actors
United States Army personnel of World War II
American male film actors
American male stage actors
American male television actors
Burials at Forest Lawn Memorial Park (Glendale)
DeWitt Clinton High School alumni
Male actors from New York City
United States Army soldiers